Douglas William Cumming Smith OBE (27 October 1924 – 22 September 1998) was a Scotland international rugby union player. He played as a Wing.

Rugby Union career

Amateur career

Smith played club rugby with Aberdeen University and London Scottish.

Provincial career

He played for North of Scotland District in their 1947 match against Midlands District.

He played on the left wing for the Whites Trial side in 1950.

International career

In 1946, while playing for the Aberdeen University club, Smith made an appearance for  against a New Zealand Army touring team, in an uncapped match held to mark the end of the Second World War. 

Smith made his capped début for the Scotland national team in January 1949, in a Five Nations Championship match against France. He went on to play in all four of Scotland's matches in that year's Championship. He played three matches in the 1950 Five Nations Championship. 

He was included in the British Lions squad for their tour to New Zealand and Australia. A broken arm kept him out until the 18th game of the tour, but he recovered to play in four tour matches against local opposition and one of the test matches against the  national team.

The Barbarians invitational team included Smith in their squad for their 1949 Easter Tour, and he featured in two games for the team, against Penarth and Newport.

Administrative career

Smith was Team Manager for the 1971 British Lions tour to New Zealand. Following a loss in the initial tour game against Queensland, Queensland coach Des Connor proclaimed the 1971 team to be "undoubtedly the worst team in history to be sent to New Zealand.". Smith countered by predicting that the Lions would win two of their test matches against New Zealand, lose one and draw the other to win the series 2–1. They went on to do exactly that, and as of 2017 are the only Lions team to have recorded a series win against New Zealand.

Following his achievements with the Lions, he was awarded the OBE in the 1972 New Year Honours list. 

He held the position of Scottish Rugby Union President for the 1986–87 season.

References

1924 births
1998 deaths
Scottish rugby union players
Scotland international rugby union players
British & Irish Lions rugby union players from Scotland
London Scottish F.C. players
Aberdeen University RFC players
Rugby union players from Aberdeen
Barbarian F.C. players
Rugby union wings
Officers of the Order of the British Empire
Presidents of the Scottish Rugby Union
Whites Trial players
North of Scotland (standalone) players